A Little Light Left is the seventh studio album by Out of the Grey, released on December 4, 2015. The album was their first since 2001.

Instead of working with a formal label, Scott and Christine Denté decided to produce A Little Light Left as an independent effort. They launched a Kickstarter campaign, "$35K in 35 Days," to fund the project. The campaign was successful beyond its target, and they began work on the album.

Track listing 
"We're Still Here" – 5:13
"Giving Up Slow" – 4:09
"Bubble Girl" – 2:58
"The Distance" – 3:55
"Speak" – 3:48
"Only Love Remains" – 3:19
"Dropped Off" – 3:34
"Two to Wonder (Instrumental)" – 1:13
"Hard to Die" – 3:45
"A Little Light Left" – 5:49
"Travel Well" – 3:28

Notes 

 "Speak" and "Dropped Off" are the first Out of the Grey songs since "That's Where I Live" (from (See Inside)) to feature exclusively Scott Denté's lead vocals.

References 

Out of the Grey albums
2015 albums